The Law of the Yukon is a 1920 American silent drama film inspired by the poem, The Law of The Yukon, by Robert W. Service. The film was directed by Charles Miller, and stars June Elvidge and Edward Earle. Portions of the movie were filmed at the Artic City studio in Port Henry, New York.

Plot
As described in a film magazine, Morgan Kleath (Earle), a young newspaper man from San Francisco, arrives in the Yukon to start a paper. His welcome is an insult from Joe Duke (Velmar), a belligerent native, that results in the latter's first defeat and brews trouble to follow for Kleath. Goldie Meadows (Deaver), the adopted daughter of Tim Meadows (Smiley), keeper of the dance hall wins the heart of Kleath, increasing Duke's rage. A robbery instigated by associates of Duke leaves clues that point to Kleath as the guilty man. Claire Meredith (Elvidge), wife of Dr. Meredith (Cooper), and Tiny Tess, a habitué of the dance hall, supply the weak souls to perish in the country's crushing power, and their two love affairs make side issues from the main romance of Kleath and Goldie. As the noose begins to threaten Kleath, his unfaithful wife arrives from 'Frisco to reveal his freedom from blame and breathes her last with the end of her testimony, permitting the union of the lovers.

Cast
Edward Earle as Morgan Kleath    
Joseph Smiley as Tim Meadows    
Nancy Deaver as Goldie    
June Elvidge as Mrs. Meredith    
Bigelow Cooper as Dr. Meredith    
Tom Velmar as Joe Duke    
Warburton Gamble as Medford Delaney    
Sara Biala as Kleath's wife    
Nadine Nash       
Tom O'Malley (credited as Thomas O'Malley)
John Webb Dillon (credited as Jack Dillon)      
Bird Millman

See also
The Spell of the Yukon     
Songs of a Sourdough

References

External links

American silent feature films
1920 films
1920 drama films
Silent American drama films
American black-and-white films
Films based on poems
Films based on works by Robert W. Service
Films directed by Charles Miller
1920s American films